Rowgir-e Qaleh Hajji (also Romanized as Rūgīr-e Qal‘eh Ḩājjī; is also known as Rūgīr-e Qal‘eh ’ājjī). It is a village in Kheyrgu Rural District, Alamarvdasht District, Lamerd County, Fars Province, Iran. During the 2006 census, its population was 173, in 41 families.

References 

Populated places in Lamerd County